Guillaume Coeckelberg (1885 – 1953) was a Belgian cyclist. He competed in two events at the 1908 Summer Olympics.

References

External links
 

1885 births
1953 deaths
Belgian male cyclists
Olympic cyclists of Belgium
Cyclists at the 1908 Summer Olympics
Cyclists from Brussels